Lover Come Back is a 1946 romantic comedy film directed by William A. Seiter.  The film stars George Brent, Lucille Ball and Vera Zorina in her last film role. Supporting actors include Raymond Walburn and Charles Winninger.

To avoid confusion with Lover Come Back (1961), this film was retitled When Lovers Meet for television.

Plot 
Kay Williams is anxious to provide feminine companionship to her war correspondent husband upon his return from service, but is jealous when she notices her husband with a beautiful combat photographer. The couple divorces but eventually makes amends; hence, "lovers come back".

Cast

George Brent as William 'Bill' Williams Jr.
Lucille Ball as Kay Williams
Vera Zorina as Madeline Laslo
Charles Winninger as William 'Pa' Williams, Sr.
Carl Esmond as Paul Millard
Raymond Walburn as J.P. 'Joe' Winthrop
Wallace Ford as Tubbs
Elisabeth Risdon as 'Ma' Williams
William Wright as Jimmy Hennessey
Louise Beavers as Martha, Kay's Maid
Franklin Pangborn as Hotel Clerk
George Chandler as Walter
Joan Shawlee as Janie (as Joan Fulton)

References

External links 
 
 
 

1946 romantic comedy films
1946 films
American romantic comedy films
Universal Pictures films
Films scored by Hans J. Salter
American black-and-white films
Films directed by William A. Seiter
1940s American films